The Prebends of Southwell were the benefices held by the Prebendaries, or Canons, of Southwell Minster.

History
The Prebends of Southwell were established from the eleventh century and by 1291, the number had grown to sixteen. In 1540 the prebends and minster were suppressed but an act of Parliament in 1543 re-established the college and church collegiate of Southwell. Under an Act of King Edward VI, the prebendaries were given pensions and their estates sold. The minster continued as the parish church on the petitions of the parishioners.

By an Act of Philip and Mary in 1557, the minster and its prebends were restored. On 2 April 1585 a set of statutes was promulgated by Queen Elizabeth I and the chapter operated under this constitution until it was dissolved in 1841. The Ecclesiastical Commissioners made provision for the abolition of the chapter as a whole; the death of each canon after this time resulted in the extinction of his prebend. The chapter came to its appointed end on 12 February 1873 with the death of the Rev Thomas Henry Shepherd, rector of Clayworth and prebendary of Beckingham.

The Prebends of Southwell now are best known by the Prebendal houses, ten of which survive to this day, most as private residences in the town.

The sixteen Prebends of Southwell are described below:

Sacrista Prebend

This is also known as the Sacrists Prebend or Segeston Prebend. The revenues for this prebend came from lands in Southwell and Bleasby, and 10% of the offerings at Pentecost.

This former prebendal house, served for a time as the headmaster's house for Southwell Minster School. The front range was built between 1774 and 1798 for Nicholas Hutchinson and incorporated parts of an earlier house
in the rear wings. It is now a retreat centre operated by the Diocese of Southwell and Nottingham. It is Grade II listed.

The Prebendaries of Sacrista Prebend

The Prebend of Normanton

The revenues for this prebend came from lands in Normanton and Southwell.

The former prebendal house of Normanton, was built for Margaretta Tibson around 1766, and probably incorporated parts of an early 18th century house. It is Grade II listed.

The Prebendaries of Normanton

The Prebend of Norwell Overhall

Also known as Norwell I. The revenues for the Prebend came from estates around Norwell, Norwell Woodhouse and Carlton-upon-Trent.

The Prebendaries of Norwell Overhall

The Prebend of Norwell Palishall

Also known as Norwell II or Norwell Palace-Hall. The revenues for the Prebend came from estates around Norwell, Norwell Woodhouse and Carlton-upon-Trent.

The Prebendaries of Norwell Palishall

The Prebend of Norwell Third Part

Also known as Norwell III. The revenues for the Prebend came from estates around Norwell, Norwell Woodhouse and Carlton-upon-Trent.

Prebendaries of Norwell Third Part

The Prebend of Woodborough

This prebend was also known as Udeborough. The revenues came from lands in the parish of Woodborough.

The Prebendaries of Woodborough

The Prebend of North Muskham

The revenues for this prebend came from lands in North Muskham, Holme and Bathley, and the tithes of the parish of Caunton.

The Prebendal House is now known as Kirkland House, and is a Grade II listed building. It was built around 1810 for the Falkner family, probably incorporating part of a house dating from 1700 in the rear wing.

The Prebendaries of North Muskham

The Prebend of Oxton

This prebend is also known as Oxton I. The revenues for this prebend came from lands in Oxton, Calverton and Cropwell Bishop, and half the tithes of the parishes of Oxton and Blidworth.

The Prebendaries of Oxton

The Prebend of Oxton and Crophyll

This prebend is also known as Oxton and Cropwell Bishop, or Oxton II. The revenues for this prebend came from lands in Oxton, Calverton, Cropwell Bishop, and Hickling, and half the tithes of the parishes in Oxton and Blidworth.

The Prebendaries of Oxton and Crophyll

The Prebend of South Muskham

The revenues for this prebend came from lands and tithes in South Muskham.

Dating from the mid 15th century, the former prebendal house of South Muskham was remodelled in the early 18th century and around 1800. A rear addition was added in 1954. It was an old people's home, but is now converted into private apartments. It is Grade II listed.

The Prebendaries of South Muskham

The Prebend of Dunham

The revenues for this prebend came from lands and tithes in the parish of Dunham, and a part of the tithes of the parish of Morton.

The Prebendaries of Dunham

The Prebend of Beckingham

The White Book of Southwell shows that Thurstan, Archbishop of York, founded the Prebend of Beckingham between 1120 and 1135. The grant was confirmed in a letter, by King Henry I at Winchester, in 1123. The Prebend of North Leverton was separated out of this in 1291.

The revenue for this prebend came from lands and tithes in Beckingham, and a quarter of the revenue from an Estate in Edingley.

The Prebendaries of Beckingham

The Prebend of Halloughton

The revenues for this prebend came from a tithe of the lands of Halloughton. It was founded ca. 1160 by Roger, Archbishop of York.

The Prebendaries of Halloughton

The Prebend of Rampton

The revenues for this prebend came from land and tithes in Rampton.

The former prebendal house dates from the early 17th century. It was rendered and defenestrated in the late 18th century, and includes late 19th century additions. It is Grade II listed.

The Prebendaries of Rampton

The Prebend of Eton

This prebend was also known as Eaton or Idleton. The revenues came from lands and tithes within the parish.

The Prebendaries of Eton

The Prebend of North Leverton

Originally part of Beckingham, it was separated into a separate prebend in 1291. The revenue for this prebend came from the lands and tithes in North Leverton.

The Prebendaries of North Leverton

References

History of the Church of England
1841 disestablishments in the United Kingdom
Anglican ecclesiastical offices
Nottinghamshire-related lists
Church of England lists
Southwell, Nottinghamshire